The 2022 Sacred Heart Pioneers football team represented Sacred Heart University as a member of the Northeast Conference (NEC) during the 2022 NCAA Division I FCS football season. The Pioneers, led by ninth-year head coach Mark Nofri, played their home games at Campus Field.

Previous season
The Pioneers finished the 2021 season 8–4, 6–1 in NEC play to win the NEC championship. They received an automatic bid to the FCS Playoffs where they lost to Holy Cross in the first round.

Schedule

Game summaries

at Lafayette

at Central Connecticut

at Morgan State

Dartmouth

Norfolk State

Stonehill

at Merrimack

Saint Francis (PA)

at Duquesne

at Wagner

LIU

References

Sacred Heart
Sacred Heart Pioneers football seasons
Sacred Heart Pioneers football